Shanell Jones (born December 7, 1981), better known by her stage name Lady Luck, is an American rapper from Englewood, New Jersey. She signed a five-album record deal with Def Jam worth between half a million and a million dollars at the age of 17 on the strength of several freestyles that she did for New York radio station WQHT-FM. Luck was featured in The New Yorker and a series of articles in The Source, which ran monthly installments on her career.

Luck was featured in the 2000 documentary film of Jay-Z's 1999 tour, Backstage. In 2017, she was a cast member on the reality show, First Family of Hip Hop and was engaged to entrepreneur Somaya Reece.

Discography

Mixtapes

Singles

As featured artist

Filmography

Television

References

Further reading

External links
Lady Luck at discogs.com
Lady Luck Are We There Yet
Instagram page
Remy Ma Vs. Lady Luck Rap Battle

1981 births
American women rappers
African-American women rappers
Def Jam Recordings artists
Living people
People from Englewood, New Jersey
Rappers from New Jersey
Songwriters from New Jersey
21st-century American rappers
21st-century American women musicians
African-American songwriters
21st-century African-American women
21st-century African-American musicians
20th-century African-American people
20th-century African-American women
21st-century women rappers